Tshimbi River is a river located in the northern Democratic Republic of the Congo. It flows through Aketi Territory in Bas-Uele District.

References

Rivers of the Democratic Republic of the Congo